Dwight's Used Records is a compilation album by American country music artist Dwight Yoakam. It was released by Audium Records on June 29, 2004. The album peaked at number 57 on the Billboard Top Country Albums chart.

Recording
The album features cuts Yoakam contributed to several tribute compilations, duets that appeared on other artists' albums, and a few unreleased covers, all in an effort to fulfill his recording contract to Audium, much like his old label Reprise did with the LP In Others’ Words the previous year. Like that album, Dwight’s Used Records sounds remarkably cohesive despite the various sources and artists involved, and speaks to the consistent run of strong recordings Yoakam and producer Pete Anderson developed over their nearly twenty-year run.  The collection contains the rootsy blend of country and bluegrass that has always been at the heart of Yoakam's music, represented here with two duets with Ralph Stanley: the patriotic but lovesick "Down Where the River Bends," and "Miner’s Prayer," the only Yoakam original on the album that first appeared on his debut Guitars, Cadillacs, Etc., Etc. in 1986.  Bluegrass surfaces again on the traditional "Deep Dark Holler" with the Nitty Gritty Dirt Band, who also back Yoakam on the Flying Burrito Brothers’s "Wheels."  (Yoakam covered another Gram Parsons-Chris Hillman classic, "Sin City," as a duet with k.d. lang on his first greatest hits package in 1989.)  He does a typically stellar job of interpreting songs by legendary country artists like Webb Pierce ("If You Were Me (And I Were You)"), Waylon Jennings ("Stop the World (And Let Me Off)"), and Johnny Cash ("Understand Your Man").  Other songs have a more contemporary sound, like the duet "Waiting," which Yoakam wrote with Deana Carter for her 2002 release I’m Just a Girl and boasts a George Harrison-Traveling Wilburys slide guitar solo.  Yoakam was also a guest on Heather Myles’s LP Sweet Talk and Good Lies the same year, sharing vocal duties on the mariachi-flavoured Vegas wedding song "Little Chapel."

Although primarily recognized as a country singer-songwriter, Yoakam has made no secret of his love for 1960s and 1970s AM pop and rock radio, from the Beatles to the Monkees, and this likely explains his cover of the Goffin-King 1962 hit "Loco-Motion" and ZZ Top’s "I’m Bad, I’m Nationwide," (Yoakam and ZZ Top guitar ace Billy Gibbons composed a song for Yoakam's ill-fated 2001 film South of Heaven- West of Hell.)  The closing number, a cover of the John Prine classic "Paradise," was a perfect fit for Yoakam, a Kentucky native himself who covered similar subject matter in his own songs like "Readin’, Rightin’, Rt. 23" and "Bury Me."

Reception
Dwight’s Used Records was Yoakam's third covers album since 1997 and was not a commercial success.  Mark Deming of AllMusic opines, "Few if any major country artists of the 1980s and '90s had as consistent a run of strong recordings as Dwight Yoakam, and this compilation proves that even the material he gave away was better than what most of his peers were sending out as top-shelf product."

Track listing

Personnel
 Deana Carter - duet vocals on "Waiting"
 Skip Edwards - percussion, piano, Wurlitzer piano
 Keith Gattis - baritone guitar, electric guitar
 Mitch Marine - drums, percussion
 Heather Myles - duet vocals on "Little Chapel"
 The Nitty Gritty Dirt Band - vocals on "Some Dark Holler" and "Wheels"
 Dave Roe - bass guitar, upright bass, background vocals
 Ralph Stanley - duet vocals on "Down Where the River Bends" and "Miner's Prayer"
 Kay Walker - background vocals
 Ray C. Walker - background vocals
 Gabe Witcher - fiddle, mandolin, background vocals
 Michael Witcher - dobro
 Dwight Yoakam - cymbals, acoustic guitar, percussion, lead vocals

Chart performance

References

2004 compilation albums
Dwight Yoakam albums
E1 Music compilation albums
Albums produced by Pete Anderson